Joanne Allan (née Nesbitt) is a former New Zealand rugby union player. She made her only appearance for New Zealand against the California Grizzlies at Christchurch in 1989.

Allan also competed in basketball and sailing. She was the South Island sailing champion in the 470 class with future Olympic silver medalist, Leslie Egnot.

References 

Living people
New Zealand female rugby union players
New Zealand women's international rugby union players
Year of birth missing (living people)